Swarn Singh Kalsi from the Kalsi Green Power Systems, LLC, Princeton, NJ was named Fellow of the Institute of Electrical and Electronics Engineers (IEEE) in 2013 for development and application of high temperature superconductor electric power equipment.

References

Fellow Members of the IEEE
Living people
Year of birth missing (living people)
Place of birth missing (living people)
American electrical engineers